Headfirst into the Flames: Live in Europe is the fifth live album by the free jazz group Last Exit, released in 1993 by MuWorks Records.

Reception

In a review for AllMusic, John Dougan wrote: "Headfirst kicks off with the brain fry of 'Lizard Eyes' only to launch into a Sharrock improv called 'Don't Be a Cry Baby, Whatever You Do.' Brotzmann blows wild and free here, and his squeal and blurt provides a great counterpoint to the rumble of the rhythms and the pummeling sonic overload of Sharrock's guitar. Another piece of blurt that will make you head spin."

Writing for Trouser Press, Greg Kot stated: "While cutthroat power is still very much part of the group's repertoire, the emphasis is more on give-and-take... 'Jesus! What Gorgeous Monkeys We Are' simmers rather than boils for all of its eleven minutes, a four-way conversation of the type rarely heard on the earlier albums."

Track listing

Accolades

Personnel 
Last Exit
Peter Brötzmann – bass saxophone, cover art
Ronald Shannon Jackson – drums
Bill Laswell – Fender 6-string bass
Sonny Sharrock – guitar
Technical personnel
Robert Musso – producer

Release history

References

External links 
 Headfirst into the Flames: Live in Europe at Bandcamp
 

1993 live albums
Last Exit (free jazz band) albums
Albums produced by Robert Musso